Servicios Aerolineas Mexicanas, also known as SAM was a Mexican airline that operated between 1992 and 1995. It was part of the first wave of newly formed airlines following the Mexican airline deregulation of 1989. At its height in 1994, it operated a fleet of 3 Douglas DC-9-10 and 1 Boeing 737-200 aircraft. Severely affected by the Mexican peso crisis, SAM ceased all operations in April 1995.

References

Airlines established in 1992
Airlines disestablished in 1995
Defunct airlines of Mexico
1992 establishments in Mexico
1995 disestablishments in Mexico